Fall Creek Township is one of twenty-two townships in Adams County, Illinois, United States.  As of the 2020 census, its population was 536 and it contained 228 housing units.

Geography

Unincorporated towns
 Fall Creek
 Marblehead
(This list is based on USGS data and may include former settlements.)

Cemeteries
The township contains four cemeteries: Bluff Hall, Craigtown, Fall Creek Chapel and Thompson.

Major highways
  Interstate 172 (spur of Interstate 72)
  US Route 36
  Illinois State Route 57
  Illinois State Route 336

Rivers
 Mississippi River

Demographics
As of the 2020 census there were 536 people, 232 households, and 177 families residing in the township. The racial makeup of the township was 92.16% White, 1.12% African American, 0.19% Native American, 0.93% Asian, 0.19% Pacific Islander, 0.19% from other races, and 5.22% from two or more races. Hispanic or Latino of any race were 1.87% of the population.

There were 232 households, out of which 35.30% had children under the age of 18 living with them, 50.86% were married couples living together, none had a female householder with no spouse present, and 23.71% were non-families. 23.70% of all households were made up of individuals, and 0.00% had someone living alone who was 65 years of age or older. The average household size was 2.79 and the average family size was 2.99.

The township's age distribution consisted of 33.8% under the age of 18, 3.6% from 18 to 24, 25.9% from 25 to 44, 26.3% from 45 to 64, and 10.4% who were 65 years of age or older. The median age was 34.7 years. For every 100 females, there were 146.0 males. For every 100 females age 18 and over, there were 96.3 males.

The median income for a household in the township was $64,167, and the median income for a family was $64,196. Males had a median income of $45,096 versus $31,573 for females. The per capita income for the township was $29,180. About 33.3% of families and 35.5% of the population were below the poverty line, including 78.1% of those under age 18 and none of those age 65 or over.

School districts
 Payson Community Unit School District 1

Political districts
 Illinois' 17th congressional district
 State House District 93
 State Senate District 47

References
 
 United States Census Bureau 2007 TIGER/Line Shapefiles
 United States National Atlas

External links
 List of Adams County township trustees
 City-Data.com
 Illinois State Archives

Townships in Adams County, Illinois
1849 establishments in Illinois
Townships in Illinois
Populated places established in 1849